Emmanuel Lawson (born 21 June 1941) is a Ghanaian boxer. He competed at the 1968 Summer Olympics and the 1972 Summer Olympics. At the 1968 Summer Olympics, he lost to Jaime Lozano of Mexico.

References

1941 births
Living people
Ghanaian male boxers
Olympic boxers of Ghana
Boxers at the 1968 Summer Olympics
Boxers at the 1972 Summer Olympics
Boxers at the 1970 British Commonwealth Games
Commonwealth Games bronze medallists for Ghana
Commonwealth Games medallists in boxing
Boxers from Accra
Light-welterweight boxers
Medallists at the 1970 British Commonwealth Games